Oscar Augustus Mitscher (June 7, 1861 – July 24, 1926) was a participant in the Oklahoma Land Run of 1889. After settling in Oklahoma Territory, he established a merchandising company, and became Mayor of Oklahoma City from 1892 to 1894, the Territorial Period before statehood. He was better known as the father of U.S. Navy Admiral Marc Mitscher, who was notable in the U.S. effort to defeat the Japanese Navy in World War II.

Early years in Oklahoma
Oscar Augustus Mitscher was born on June 7, 1861, in Hillsboro, Wisconsin. Very little about his early life has been published, other than that his parents were immigrants to Wisconsin from Germany, named Andreas Mischer and Constantina Mohn. apparently moved to Oklahoma City in 1889, located in what was then known as Indian Territory. In 1900, President William McKinley appointed Mitscher as the U.S. Agent for the Osage Nation, which had already been moved to a reservation within the new territory. His new post was located at the present-day community of Pawhuska, Oklahoma.

Oscar married Myrta Viola Shear and had three children. Their son, Marc Mitscher, became an admiral in the United States Navy. The Shear family also lived in Hillsboro, Wisconsin, and made the Land Run of 1889.Byron D. Shear, Myrta's brother, also became a mayor of Oklahoma City. Her father, Thomas J. Shear, was a member of the Wisconsin State Assembly. Oscar A. Mitscher died on July 24, 1926.

Family
Oscar and Myrta had three children: Marc A. (1887 - 1947); Zoe Mitscher Hoevel (1887 - 1966); and Thomas Oscar (1895 - 1955). 
Zoe was born in Wisconsin and came to Oklahoma with her parents for the Run of 1889. She married Hugo Henry Hoevel, who formerly lived in Tulsa, before moving to Okmulgee, where he owned and operated the Hotel Belmont for eight years. He predeceased Zoe, dying of a heart attack in 1950. Hugo and Zoe had a son, Kenneth, who survived them.

Political career
Mitscher was Mayor from 1892 to 1894, before Oklahoma became a state. He was a Republican.

Notes

References

External links
The Political Graveyard

People from Hillsboro, Wisconsin
Mayors of Oklahoma City
Oklahoma Republicans
1861 births
1926 deaths
Burials in Oklahoma